"Boundless Oceans, Vast Skies" (lit. "sea wide sky empty") is a song written and recorded by the Hong Kong rock band Beyond. Released in 1993 on the Cantonese album Rock and Roll, the song was and remains massively popular. The song has been also translated as "Under a Vast Sky", "Ocean Wide Sky High", "Vast Seas, Clear Skies", and
"Clear Skies, Vast Ocean". The song is an anthem of Cantonese rock music and one of Beyond's signature songs. It has been adopted for several events in Cantonese-speaking regions, such as the Artistes 512 Fund Raising Campaign for the 2008 Sichuan earthquake, and most prominently as the unofficial anthem of the 2014 Hong Kong protests.

Ka Kui was inspired by his trip to Africa in 1990 (after which he also wrote one of his most popular songs "Amani" ("Peace" in Swahili). Its theme – personal freedom and the pursuit of dreams – flowed from Wong's disillusionment with the music industry. It was written to celebrate the tenth anniversary of the band's formation. However, the band vocalist Wong Ka Kui died on 30 June 1993, around two months after the song's release. It went on to gain critical acclaim and commercial success.

Beyond recorded a Japanese version, .

In the 2003 Hong Kong movie Truth or Dare: 6th Floor Rear Flat, the song was performed live by  Teresa Carpio, where it was interpreted as the sacrifice a mother had made for her son.

In 2010, Cai Xiuqing performed the song for China's Got Talent, earning her third place. In 2012, Hong Kong a cappella group Metro Vocal Group released a cover on their album No Borders.

References

External links 
 "The Hong Kong Protests’ Anthem: "Under a Vast Sky"", Voice Project, 1 October 2014

Cantopop
1993 songs
Beyond (band) songs
Protest songs
2014 Hong Kong protests
Rock ballads
Pop ballads